Enrico Santià (born November 6, 1918 in Santhià) was an Italian professional football player.

1918 births
Year of death missing
Italian footballers
Serie A players
Juventus F.C. players
Novara F.C. players
Torino F.C. players
Calcio Padova players
People from Santhià
Association football midfielders
Footballers from Piedmont
Sportspeople from the Province of Vercelli